Ninian Jamieson Finlay (31 January 1858 – 7 March 1936) was a Scottish international rugby player. He vies for this record with Charles Reid, who was the same age when capped - however, Reid had lived through an extra leap year day, when he was capped in 1881.

Rugby Union career

Amateur career

Finlay attended Edinburgh Academy, which he was attending when capped.

"Ninian was still a schoolboy, but was such an incredibly powerful runner, and sublime drop-kicker that he became the first real superstar of Scottish rugby."

He later played for Edinburgh Academicals and Edinburgh University RFC.

Provincial career

Finlay played for Edinburgh District.

He played for East of Scotland District in 1876.

International career

The first historian of Scottish rugby, R.J. Phillips, says of Ninian Finlay, "there never was such glamour and reputation attached to any Scottish player till A.R. Don Wauchope reached the zenith of his powers."

Law career

In later life he was a Writer to the Signet.

Family

Ninian was the brother of James Finlay, who was capped four times for Scotland (1871–75),  Arthur Finlay, who received a single cap (1875), and Robert Finlay, 1st Viscount Finlay.

References

Sources

 Bath, Richard (ed.) The Scotland Rugby Miscellany (Vision Sports Publishing Ltd, 2007 )
 Godwin, Terry Complete Who's Who of International Rugby (Cassell, 1987)
 Massie, Allan A Portrait of Scottish Rugby (Polygon, Edinburgh)

1858 births
1936 deaths
Alumni of the University of Edinburgh
East of Scotland District players
Edinburgh Academicals rugby union players
Edinburgh District (rugby union) players
Edinburgh University RFC players
People educated at Edinburgh Academy
Rugby union players from Edinburgh
Scotland international rugby union players
Scottish rugby union players